The Beach Boys Today! is the eighth studio album by the American rock band the Beach Boys, released March 8, 1965 on Capitol Records. It signaled a departure from their previous records with its orchestral sound, intimate subject matter, and abandonment of car or surf songs.  Side one features an uptempo sound, while side two consists mostly of introspective ballads. Supported by this thematic approach, the record became an early example of a rock concept album and established the group as album artists rather than just a singles band. It has since become regarded as one of the greatest albums of all time.

The album was produced, arranged, and largely written by Brian Wilson with additional lyrics by Mike Love. Most of it was recorded in January 1965 with the aid of over 25 studio musicians shortly after Wilson had suffered a nervous breakdown and stopped touring with his bandmates. Building on the advancements of All Summer Long (1964), Today! showcased more refined performances, denser and richer arrangements, slower tempos, longer structures, and influences drawn from Phil Spector and Burt Bacharach.

Unlike their prior albums, none of the songs employ just traditional rock instrumentation as accompaniment. Instead, a more eclectic selection of instruments, including timpani, harpsichord, vibraphone, and French horn, feature throughout the album. Lyrically, Wilson developed a more personalized, semi-autobiographical approach, with his songs written from the perspective of vulnerable, neurotic, and insecure narrators. The LP includes "She Knows Me Too Well", about a man who acknowledges his cruel treatment of his girlfriend, "Don't Hurt My Little Sister", about a sibling who appears to conflate fraternal and romantic feelings for his younger sister, and "In the Back of My Mind", a ballad that ends with a breakdown of instruments playing out of sync from each other.

Today! reached number four in the US during a 50-week chart stay and yielded three top 20 singles: "When I Grow Up (To Be a Man)" (number 9), "Dance, Dance, Dance" (number 8), and "Do You Wanna Dance?" (number 12). A rerecorded version of "Help Me, Rhonda", issued in April, became the band's second number-one hit in the US. In the UK, the album was released in April 1966 and peaked at number 6.  Today! continues to attract critical acclaim, with commentators usually focusing on the second side of the record, often describing it as a precursor to Pet Sounds (1966).

Background

Following the success of their chart-topping "I Get Around" single, the Beach Boys' touring schedule became considerably more busy. From June to August, the group toured in support of their newest LP, All Summer Long, which had marked the most complex arrangements on a Beach Boys record to date, as well as being the first that was not focused on themes of cars or surfing. They also readied a Christmas album for release in November. By the end of the year, they had released four albums in 12 months and additionally recorded the singles "When I Grow Up (To Be a Man)" and "Dance, Dance, Dance". In November, they toured the UK and mainland Europe for the first time, appearing on various television programs and playing shows.

By this point, principal songwriter Brian Wilson had become overwhelmed by the increasing pressures of his career and personal life. He later explained, "I used to be Mr Everything ... I was run down mentally and emotionally because I was running around, jumping on jets from one city to another on one-night stands, also producing, writing, arranging, singing, planning, teaching – to the point where I had no peace of mind and no chance to actually sit down and think or even rest." Adding to his concerns was the group's "business operations" and the quality of their records, which he believed suffered from this arrangement. During the European tour, frontman and lyricist Mike Love told Melody Maker that he and the band wished to move on from surf music and avoid resting on the band's laurels.

Wilson was also wracked with anxiety over his relationship with 16-year-old singer Marilyn Rovell. During the group's tour of Europe, he began consuming alcohol more frequently than he ever had, and channeled his feelings into writing songs. On December 7, in an effort to bring himself more emotional stability, he impulsively married Rovell. Around this time, he was introduced to marijuana by a new acquaintance from the music industry, Loren Schwartz. Wilson's habitual use of the drug caused a rift between himself and Rovell.

On December 23, Wilson was to accompany his bandmates on a two-week US tour, but while on a flight from Los Angeles to Houston, began sobbing uncontrollably over his marriage and suffered a nervous breakdown. Al Jardine, who had sat next to Wilson on the plane, later said, "None of us had ever witnessed something like that." Brian played the show in Houston later that day, but was substituted by session musician Glen Campbell for the rest of the tour dates. This was the first time Wilson had skipped concert dates with the Beach Boys since 1963.

Over the next month, the group returned to studio sessions and finished the tracks that formed The Beach Boys Today!. Wilson ultimately declared to his bandmates that he would be withdrawing from future tours for an indefinite period of time. He said, "I told them I foresee a beautiful future for the Beach Boys group, but the only way we could achieve it was if they did their job and I did mine." According to Barry Mann and Cynthia Weil, Wilson had been considering retiring from the music industry, but changed his mind upon hearing their recent song "You've Lost That Lovin' Feelin'" (produced and co-written by Phil Spector). Wilson later told a journalist that his decision to quit touring was a byproduct of his "fucked up" jealousy over Spector and the Beatles. Journalist Nick Kent wrote that Wilson had also been "listening intently" to the work of Burt Bacharach and Hal David.

Style

Orchestrations and concept

The Beach Boys Today! marked a stylistic departure from previous Beach Boys LPs and was their most musically sophisticated to date, featuring more complex and innovative arrangements. Academic Jadey O'Regan identified the album as the start of a period in which the band focused predominately on "unexpected structures and chordal movements, dense vocal harmonies, and a wide variety of orchestral textures not often heard in popular music of the time." However, musicologist Phillip Lambert disagreed with the notion that "Brian wrote B-side songs before his December catharsis and A-side songs in the sunny glow of his subsequent freedom", believing that the compositions which preceded his plane episode still showed evidence of progressive ingenuity.

Today! was arranged as a concept album, with the first side of the record consisting of uptempo songs and the other side consisting of ballads. As music historian James Perone writes, "it was organized in such a way as to explore moods that extended from song to song. In other words, more than anything else Wilson had produced before, it was a coherent work and not just a collection of stand-alone songs." However, the thematic consistency is undercut by the presence of a filler track, "Bull Session with the "Big Daddy"", placed at the very end of the album.

Many of Wilson's new songs were written under the influence of marijuana, as his 2016 memoir suggested, "smoking a little bit of pot ... changed the way I heard arrangements." Further on the subject, he commented in an interview, "It opened some doors for me, and I got a little more committed to music than I had done before, more committed to the making of music for people on a spiritual level." Journalist David Howard argued that Wilson's use of marijuana had an "immediate effect" on his writing and production style, influencing the slower tempos, "more expansive" arrangements, introspective lyrics, as well as his "thinking in regard to the recording process ... his productions became denser and richer."

Unlike their prior records, none of the songs feature just basic rock instrumentation as accompaniment (drums, bass, guitar, piano, organ, vocals). Seven of the eleven songs feature orchestral-style instrumentation, while the remaining four use basic rock set-ups as a foundation, being augmented with other instruments that the band members themselves could not play. Also featured are a range of percussion instruments, from sleigh bells and timbales to triangles.

Producer Phil Ramone stated that Wilson began employing "adjacent things—like a woodwind quartet with an accordion underneath. We hadn't heard that before—not in pop music. Claude Thornhill or Gil Evans might have used these voicings in their jazz arrangements, but from this point on Brian began introducing some incredible instrumental clusters to mainstream pop music." 

Owing to the greater number of ballads, Wilson invokes his signature falsetto nine times on the record, the most he had on a Beach Boys album since 1963's Surfer Girl. Unusually, Dennis Wilson sang lead on the first and last songs on the album ("Do You Wanna Dance?" and "In the Back of My Mind"). This was because Brian had felt that Dennis "never really had a chance to sing very much", and so he gave him more leads on the album.

Themes and musical structures

Lyrically, Wilson developed a more personalized, semi-autobiographical approach, with his songs written from the perspective of vulnerable, neurotic, and insecure narrators. All of the songs are expressed from a first-person perspective, and none of them involve themes related to cars or surfing. Instead, they offer a matured take on romantic relationships, as well as being more introspective, relating to such themes as growing up. Music historian Charles Granata said that the songs "exhibit a unified lyrical theme: the wonder of adolescent love and the expression of tender, pleading affection", subject matter that was "far more" substantial than when the group "declare[d] their love for a girl, car, or the surf."

Virtually every song expresses anticipation or apprehensiveness about the future, and the album is consistent with the Beach Boys' past records by remaining largely concerned with teenage experiences. Journalist Alice Bolin wrote, "This makes some sense – Wilson was barely out of high school when the Beach Boys formed – but on Today!, the childlike lyrics take a turn for the unsettling", particularly when scrutinized against Wilson's 22-year-old perspective, as Bolin felt, "Wilson's attraction to teenage girls and his prolonged interest in teenage life smacks of a kind of arrested development."  In the book Yeah Yeah Yeah: The Story of Modern Pop, Bob Stanley remarked of the lyrics, "Brian was aiming for Johnny Mercer but coming up proto-indie."

Today! contained more songs with a verse-chorus structure than any prior Beach Boys album. Jazz chord types and relations appear in many songs, including "When I Grow Up", "Kiss Me, Baby", and "Please Let Me Wonder".  O'Regan uses the aforementioned songs as examples of "a maturing view of life and relationships that were underpinned by and reflected in the expandable and flexible verse-chorus form." He wrote that Today! offered the "clearest example" of the group's pre-1967 "lyrical experimentation" due to the "longer and more flexible structures".

Side two marks the introduction of major seventh and major ninth chords, which, O'Regan states, "soften the lively sound of the A side". Journalist Scott Interrante noted that "it would be a mistake to assume that the ballads are more sophisticated. ... Wilson proves that he can be just as harmonically and structurally inventive with catchy dance songs as he can with emotional ballads." Likewise, "Even in the upbeat songs like 'Do You Wanna Dance?' and 'Dance, Dance, Dance', there is a sense of focus on the future, and a distinct, unsettling feeling that they’re trying to dance off." He further characterized A-side songs such as "Good to My Baby" and "Don't Hurt My Little Sister" with having a "deceptive simplicity" in their music and lyrics.

Recording

The Beach Boys Today! was largely recorded between January 7 and 19, 1965 at Western Studio in Hollywood.  Other studios used were Gold Star ("Do You Wanna Dance?") and RCA Victor ("Dance, Dance, Dance"). Four songs were recorded in the previous year: "She Knows Me Too Well" and "Don't Hurt My Little Sister" (June), "When I Grow Up (To Be a Man)" (August), "Dance, Dance, Dance" (October), and the backing track for "Kiss Me, Baby" (December 16).

Wilson had been employing the services of Phil Spector's session musicians (later known as "the Wrecking Crew") since the Surfer Girl sessions. He used them to a greater degree on Today!, with the number of studio musicians used for each track usually exceeding 11 players, while performance takes ran to the 30s.  Dillon writes that the further takes "showed his studio skills were sharper than ever and [that he] was increasingly demanding of both the session musicians and the group."  Wilson's 2016 memoir states that, following the airplane episode, he had endeavored to "take the things I learned from Phil Spector and use more instruments whenever I could. I doubled up on basses and tripled up on keyboards, which made everything sound bigger and deeper."

The recording process typically involved recording an instrumental on two tracks of 3-track tape with one remaining track left for the first vocal overdub. This tape was then dubbed down to a second tape for an additional layer of vocal overdubs. Today! was ultimately mixed down to mono and was their first album not to be issued in stereo since Surfin' U.S.A. (1963). Select tracks from the album were later remixed for stereo on Beach Boys compilation albums. A complete stereo mix of Today! was first released in 2012.

Contents

Side one

"Do You Wanna Dance?"
"Do You Wanna Dance?" is a cover of the R&B song by Bobby Freeman, who had a top 10 hit with it in 1958. It is distinguished from the original through its lush orchestration, three-part vocal arrangement, and instrumental bridge key change. Dillon speculated that the rendition may have been inspired by the version by Del Shannon, who had recently recorded the song, although the Beach Boys' version bears a "closer resemblance" to an earlier version by Cliff Richard and the Shadows. It was the first song the group recorded at Gold Star, Spector's favorite studio, and their second song that employed a timpani.

"Good to My Baby"
"Good to My Baby" is about a man responding to criticisms regarding the way he treats his girlfriend. Interrante opined that while it is not "musically exciting or complex", the defensive and anxious tone "running throughout the song adds a dark quality that’s not immediately on the surface, and ultimately makes 'Good to My Baby' all the more interesting." O'Regan highlights the use of a major supertonic function (II) with giving "the [chord] progression a surprising lift under the positivity of the lyrics – it reaffirms the confidence the singer feels about his relationship, despite what others may think."

"Don't Hurt My Little Sister"

"Don't Hurt My Little Sister" is about a sibling who appears to conflate fraternal and romantic feelings for his younger sister. The lyrical inspiration is often attributed to Wilson's conflicted infatuations toward Marilyn and her sisters Diane and Barbara.  According to Wilson's 2016 memoir, it was written "about me and the Rovells. I wrote it from the perspective of one of them telling me not to treat another one of them badly." Carlin wrote that the subject matter "recounts Diane Rovell's pointed advice from the early (and surreptitious) days of Brian and Marilyn's affair, only with an uncomfortable fraternal ardor: Why don’t you love her like her big brother?"

Wilson wrote the song for the Ronettes, modelling the chords and melodies after Spector's songs, and submitted it to Spector. He accepted the song, but rewrote the lyrics, renamed it "Things Are Changing (For the Better)", and recorded it with the Blossoms. Wilson was to play piano on the recording session before being dismissed by Spector due to a substandard performance. Wilson later recycled the chord progression of the song's refrain for the band's "California Girls" (1965).

"When I Grow Up (To Be a Man)"

"When I Grow Up (To Be a Man)" is about a boy who is anxious of when he stops being a teenager. At the time, Brian told the Birmingham Post, "When I was younger, I used to worry about turning into an old square over the years. I don't think I will now, and that is what inspired 'When I Grow Up'." In a 2011 interview, he commented that when he wrote the song, he had a dismal view of his future. In his 2016 memoir, Love wrote that the song was "probably influenced" by Murry Wilson, who constantly challenged Brian's manhood.

In the lyrics, the narrator poses such question as "Will I love my wife for the rest of my life?" That line in particular marked the first instance of a Beach Boys song discussing falling out of love with someone, as opposed to just being in or out of a relationship. Critic Richard Meltzer later cited "When I Grow Up" as the moment when the Beach Boys "abruptly ceased to be boys". It is one of the first rock songs to discuss impending adulthood and is possibly the earliest US top 40 song to contain the expression "turn on" (from the lyric "will I still like the things that turned me on as a kid?").

Granata wrote that the song "best exemplifies the [band's] musical growth" through its "effective combination of odd sounds" and its "full and round" vocal harmonies. With the exception of the harmonica in the verses, all the instruments were played by the group members themselves. It took 37 takes to record. O'Regan afforded attention to the drum pattern for avoiding a traditional backbeat rhythm. Instead, it "effectively plays 'around' the vocals with interesting fills adding texture and drama to the passing of time in the lyrics. Each part of the drum kit works independently from each other, horizontally as four separate parts, rather than a whole set working together."

"Help Me, "

"Help Me, " is about someone whose fiance left him for another man and subsequently begs for a woman named Ronda to "help me get her out of my heart" with a one-night stand. It was sung by Al Jardine, his second ever lead vocal for the group. Wilson and Love denied speculation that the "Ronda" mentioned in the lyric was based on a real-life person, although Love said that the opening lines drew from his high school experiences.

Wilson said that he came up with the song while "fooling around on the piano" playing Bobby Darin's "Mack the Knife" with its "cool, shuffle beat". O'Regan felt that "the uneven rhythm" represented "both the limping pain from the previous relationship, and the heart-skipping feeling of new love." The song ends with a series of fake fade-outs, described by journalist Alexis Petridis as "undercutting the triumphant chorus with a weird sense of uncertainty."

"Dance, Dance, Dance"

"Dance, Dance, Dance", written in a similar vein as "I Get Around", is about escaping emotional stress through music and dancing. It is their first song with a writing credit to Carl Wilson, who devised the guitar riff. Interrante praised the band's performance on the track: "Despite being joined by some studio players, it's Carl’s 12-string playing, especially his solo, and Dennis Wilson's ecstatic drumming that are the real driving forces behind the song." An earlier version of the song, recorded in Nashville in September 1964, was included as a bonus track on the album's 1990 reissue.

Side two

"Please Let Me Wonder"

"Please Let Me Wonder" was the first song Wilson wrote under the influence of marijuana. It is about a man who is afraid that a woman will reveal that she does not love him, and so he instead prefers to fantasize that she does. Wilson said that he did the song "as a tribute to Phil Spector", although the arrangement, which highlights different, individual instruments throughout the song, was in direct contrast to the methods employed by Spector for his Wall of Sound.

The instrumentation includes drums, timpani, tambourine, bass, two guitars, acoustic guitar, piano, tack piano, organ, horns, and vibraphone. In Howard's description, the song "specifically demonstrates" Wilson's "newfound insight" of "deconstruct[ing] songs into tiny increments and deal with each instrument individually, stacking sounds one at a time."

"I'm So Young"
"I'm So Young" is a rendition of the 1958 doo-wop hit originally performed by the Students. Wilson chose to record the song because another version by the Ronettes' Veronica Bennett had recently been issued as a single. In contrast to the album's other cover song, "Do You Wanna Dance?", the Beach Boys' approach to "I'm So Young" deviated minimally from the original. Interrante pointed to the outro (a feature that Wilson invented for his version) as the arrangement's most "innovative" quality. An earlier version of the band's recording, containing a flute and a more prominent bassline, was released on the album's 1990 reissue. Wilson soon revisited the song's "too young to get married" lyrical theme for the group's  "Wouldn't It Be Nice" (1966).

"Kiss Me, Baby"

"Kiss Me, Baby" is about a quarrel between the narrator and his lover, and his attempt to repair their relationship. Wilson was inspired to write "Kiss Me, Baby" while walking around a red light district in Copenhagen days after proposing to his soon-to-be wife. Love said that the "wistful bass line ... led to my lyrics about a guy who has a disagreement with his girlfriend, even though they can't even remember what they fought about, leaving them both brokenhearted." Dillon cited it as "a ballad that pleaded for the romantic reconciliation [Wilson] anticipated with Marilyn." Conversely, Interrante said that the track is different from the album's other songs in that it "doesn't seem to lyrically parallel Brian Wilson’s personal life at the time" and focuses "on coming to terms with the present" rather than anticipating the future.

The arrangement features basses, guitars, saxophone, pianos, vibraphone, drums, and temple blocks—the sound of the latter percussion soon became a signature for Wilson– as well as English horn and French horn. Doo-wop style background vocals sing "Kiss a little bit, fight a little bit" repetitively throughout the chorus and outro. Interrante described the song as among Wilson's "most interesting compositions" in addition to containing "some of the thickest and most beautiful harmonies the group had pulled off up to that point." Biographer Jon Stebbins praised "Kiss Me, Baby" as "the pinnacle of balladry", one of the group's "most romantic and emotional songs", and "a mammoth artistic achievement". A vocals-only mix was included on the 2003 compilation Hawthorne, CA.

"She Knows Me Too Well"

"She Knows Me Too Well" showcases a narrator who is critical of how he treats his girlfriend and admits to having jealousy and double standards in the relationship. However, he convinces himself that his emotional abuse is fine, since it is mitigated by the fact that "she can tell I really love her". Wilson considered the song to be an homage to Burt Bacharach.

It was the first track attempted for the album, although the original recorded version, made in June 1964, was scrapped in favor of a remake that was cut in August, during the same session for "When I Grow Up". The high-pitched percussion sound was made by hitting a screwdriver on a microphone boom pole.

"In the Back of My Mind"
"In the Back of My Mind" is about someone who describes themselves as "blessed with everything", yet has unfounded suspicions that his happy relationship will someday disintegrate. It features a dissonant orchestration and instruments such as saxophone, strings, and oboe. Dennis Wilson sang the lead without the accompaniment of any vocal harmonies. It is one of the group's songs that most heavily draw from the Tin Pan Alley style of songwriting, and in Lambert's assessment, the chord patterns "are virtually unprecedented in Brian's work."  It ends with a breakdown of its instruments playing out of sync from each other.

It is regarded among fans and critics as one of the band's "masterpieces". Peter Doggett said of Dennis' performance, "he showed for the first time an awareness that his voice could be a blunt emotional instrument. ... his erratic croon cut straight to the heart, with an urgency that his more precise brothers could never have matched." Granata described the track as "disturbing" and "the antithesis of any prescribed commercial formula—a curious experiment marking an extreme deviation from the band." Howard similarly regarded its "stony lead vocal" and "warped string arrangement" as Wilson's "most ambitious arrangement to date." A 1975 recording of Brian performing the song on piano was released as a bonus track on the deluxe edition of his 2015 solo album No Pier Pressure.

"Bull Session with the 'Big Daddy"

"Bull Session with the 'Big Daddy'" ends the album with a spoof interview of the band, conducted by journalist Earl Leaf, in which they discuss the group's recent tour of Europe. The track is a 2-minute edit of a recording that originally ran for over 20 minutes. At one point, Brian remarks, "Well, I haven't made a mistake yet in my whole career", to which Love adds, "Brian, we keep waiting for you to make a mistake."

Leftover songs

"All Dressed Up for School" was a leftover track recorded by the band on September 14, 1964. The song was originally written by Wilson and Love for the singer Sharon Marie, as "What'll I Wear to School Today". Lambert described "All Dressed Up For School" as "packed with musical invention" and said that the lyrics are "interesting" despite being "unsuitable for release in 1964." In 1990, it was released as a bonus track on a reissue of Little Deuce Coupe and All Summer Long.

"Guess I'm Dumb", written by Wilson and producer Russ Titelman, was tracked on October 14, 1964.  Wilson's 2016 memoir states: "When I was finished, no one from the band wanted to sing it. The message was okay, but maybe it was just the idea of being dumb." In March 1965, Wilson gave the song to Glen Campbell as a show of thanks for his services with the touring group. It became Campbell's tenth single on Capitol, issued on June 7. Howard said it was Wilson's "most inspired" production to date, featuring a "surging, elegant Burt Bacharach-inspired string and horn arrangement and Campbell's forlorn Roy Orbison-like vocal."

Release

Three tracks from the album were issued on two singles in the months prior the LP's release. "When I Grow Up (To Be a Man)" (B-side "She Knows Me Too Well") was issued on August 24 and peaked at number 9 in the US and number 27 in the UK. On October 26, it was followed with "Dance, Dance, Dance", reaching number 8 in the US and number 24 in the UK. On November 28, the band were filmed for the concert film T.A.M.I. Show, playing "Dance, Dance, Dance" and other hits.

From January 27 to February 27, 1965, the band toured North America, with Campbell again substituting for Wilson. On February 15, "Do You Wanna Dance?" (B-side "Please Let Me Wonder"), was issued as the third single, peaking at number 12 in the US. On February 28, the band (with Brian) appeared on Shindig! performing "Do You Wanna Dance?" and a truncated version of "Please Let Me Wonder".

Released on March 8, The Beach Boys Today! was a great commercial success, rising to number four in the Billboard charts on May 1. In April, a rerecorded version of "Help Me, Ronda" (retitled "Help Me, Rhonda") was issued as a single, becoming the group's second number-one hit in the US. This version of the song was included on the band's next LP, Summer Days (And Summer Nights!!), released in July. On October 1, the RIAA awarded Today! gold certification, indicating over 500,000 units sold.

In the UK, the album was released in April 1966 and peaked at number 6. Reviewing the album for London Life, Barry Fantoni described the "marvellous" production and numerous "really beautiful tunes" as displaying the Beach Boys at their peak.

Retrospective assessments

The Beach Boys Today! remains a "highly acclaimed" album, although most of the critical attention has been reserved for the second side of the record. Writing in the book Icons of Rock, Scott Schinder highlighted the ballad side as "startling, both in their lyrical vulnerability and their distinctive arrangements."  Petridis opined that the "overlooked first half is equally fascinating" for its emotional content, noting that "even the filler of Don't Hurt My Little Sister carries a slightly dark undercurrent."

On the band's subsequent releases, Wilson's writing and production style continued to grow in its sophistication, to the extent that writers often refer to the second side of the record as a precursor to the 1966 album Pet Sounds. Writing for PopMatters, Bolin called Today! "an important artifact, with its sound forming a link between the Beach Boys' doo-wop-influenced beginnings and the lush and orchestral Pet Sounds. Interrante wrote that it was "an exciting album" that showed early signs of Wilson "blur[ring] the lines between ballad and uptempo songs", and that in contrast to Pet Sounds, "Today! is about the optimism, not the sadness, of leaving adolescence."

Less favorably, biographer Steven Gaines criticized Today! as "not one of Brian's best works, consisting mostly of a melange of uninspired car tunes  ..." Reviewing the album for AllMusic, Richie Unterberger declared that it was "strong almost from start to finish." Similarly, Schinder wrote that it "would have been the first Beach Boys LP to be sublime from beginning to end, were it not for the closing track". Interrante said of "Bull Session with the 'Big Daddy'", "one seriously questions why it was included at all. ... I think we can all agree that the album would be better off without it." Bolin decreed that "it can be hard to separate Today! from the masterpiece it led to – so much so that Today! can feel like a rehearsal for Pet Sounds, with its themes and ideas repeated and perfected in the later album." However, she also states that "to hear it only in relation to Pet Sounds would be to undermine what a strange and original work Today! really is."

Today! regularly appears on "top album lists" conducted by publications such as Rolling Stone. In 2005, it was included in the book 1001 Albums You Must Hear Before You Die. In 2007, The Guardian included it among "1000 Albums to Hear Before You Die". In 2012, it was ranked number 271 on Rolling Stones list of the "500 Greatest Albums of All Time", with the entry stating, "Brian Wilson was already a genius. He writes sweet California tunes here, and the haunting 'She Knows Me Too Well' hits Pet Sounds-deep." On the list's 2020 edition, the record's position descended to number 466. , it is listed as the 997th-highest rated album on Acclaimed Music.

Impact and influence

With Today!, the Beach Boys established themselves as album artists rather than just a singles band. Schinder credited its "suite-like structure" with presenting "an early manifestation of the rock album format being used to make a cohesive artistic statement – an idea that Brian would soon explore more fully." Bolin similarly recognized it as the band's "first flirtation with the album-as-art form." In Perone's belief, Today! began the reciprocal chain of influence between the Beatles and the Beach Boys, inspiring "at least" part of the Beatles' Rubber Soul (1965), which in turn inspired Pet Sounds.

In his book 1965: The Most Revolutionary Year in Music (2015), Andrew Grant credits Today! with marking the starting point for "the era of baroque pop, a.k.a. chamber pop, in which bands fused elements of classical with rock". Journalist Paul Lester said that the album "set new standards for rock", while Bolin concluded that the LP's "intricate and sophisticated music  ... brought the group, and pop music in general to a new place."

Reissues and compilations
 In 1990, Today! was packaged with Summer Days for a CD reissue that included alternate takes of "Dance, Dance, Dance" and "I'm So Young" as bonus tracks.
 In 2012, Capitol issued a remastered mono and stereo edition of the album.
 In 2014, Capitol released Keep an Eye on Summer – The Beach Boys Sessions 1964, a rarities compilation that included alternate versions of "She Knows Me Too Well", "Don't Hurt My Little Sister", "When I Grow Up (To Be a Man)", "I'm So Young", "All Dressed Up for School", and "Dance, Dance, Dance".

Track listing
Lead vocals per Craig Slowinski.

Note
 "Kiss Me, Baby" and "Please Let Me Wonder" were originally the only tracks on the album that listed a writing credit to Mike Love. Following his 1994 lawsuit, Love v. Wilson, he was awarded co-writing credits to seven more songs: "Good to My Baby", "Don't Hurt My Little Sister", "When I Grow Up (To Be a Man)", "Help Me, Ronda", "Dance, Dance, Dance", "She Knows Me Too Well", and "In the Back of My Mind".

Personnel
Per band archivist Craig Slowinski.

The Beach Boys
Al Jardine – lead (5), harmony (1, 4, 6–10) and backing vocals (1–4, 6–10), electric rhythm guitar (6), bass guitar (3–4, 8, 10)
Mike Love – lead (2–4, 6, 9), harmony (1, 4–10) and backing vocals (1–10), spoken word (12)
Brian Wilson – lead (2–4, 6–10), harmony (1, 4–7, 9–10) and backing vocals (1–7, 9–11), spoken word (12), four (6) and six-string bass guitar (8), grand (1–2), upright (3–4, 7, 9–10) and tack piano, Baldwin harpsichord (4), Farfisa (7) and Hammond organ (8), production (8, 11), mixing (8), conductor (11)
Carl Wilson – harmony (1, 4–10) and backing vocals (1–2, 4–11), spoken word (12), lead (1–11), rhythm (1–4, 8, 10), and 12-string guitar (1, 3, 5, 8), six-string bass guitar (8)
Dennis Wilson – lead (1, 11), harmony (4–10), backing (2–10) and double-tracked vocals (11), spoken word (12), drums (4, 6, 8, 10), percussion (7), hi-hat (4), tambourine (3, 7), tom-tom (7)

Guests
Earl Leaf – spoken word (12)
"Louie" (last name unknown) – castanets
Russ Titelman – percussion (microphone boom hit with screwdriver) (10)
Ron Swallow – tambourine (2, 5, 7–8), woodblock (7)
Marilyn Wilson – harmony (1) and backing vocals (1), spoken word (12)

Session musicians (later known as "the Wrecking Crew")

Hal Blaine – drums (1–3, 5, 9, 11), woodblocks (1), sleigh bells (6), triangle (6), tambourine (6), castanets (6), temple block (9, 11), claves (1), timbales (5, 11)
Glen Campbell – 12-string acoustic guitar (5–7)
Peter Christ – cor anglais (9, 11)
Steve Douglas – tenor saxophone (1–2, 5–7, 9, 11)
David Duke – French horn (9)
John Gray – grand piano (3)
Carl Fortina – accordion (6)
Plas Johnson – tenor saxophone (1–2, 5, 7, 11)
Carol Kaye – bass guitar (2, 7, 9, 11)
Barney Kessel – classical guitar (7), 12-string guitar (9)
Larry Knechtel – bass guitar (1)
Carrol Lewis – double-reed harmonica (4)
Jack Nimitz – baritone saxophone (7)
Jay Migliori – baritone saxophone (1–2, 5–6, 9, 11)
Earl Palmer – drums (7), timbales (7)
Don Randi – grand (7) and tack upright piano (2), organ (2, 7, 11)
Bill Pitman – electric guitar (1–2, 5), acoustic guitar (1–2, 9, 11)
Ray Pohlman – baritone guitar (3), bass guitar (3, 5–6, 9)
Billy Lee Riley – double-reed harmonica (5, 7, 11)
Leon Russell – grand piano (5, 9), organ (1), vibraphone (11)
Billy Strange – acoustic (7) and electric guitar (2, 9, 11), electric mandolin (1), ukulele (5)
Tommy Tedesco – autoharp (2, 11), baritone (1) and electric guitar (2–3), mandolin (1)
Julius Wechter – vibraphone (9), bell tree (9), timpani (1), tambourine (1), congas (2), claves (5)
Jerry Williams – vibraphone (7), timpani (7)
unknown – oboe, cellos, violins, violas, English horn 

Technical staff
Chuck Britz – engineer (1, 3, 5, 8, 10–11)
Larry Levine – engineer (1)

Charts

Notes

References

Bibliography

Further reading

External links

 Full album playlist on YouTube

The Beach Boys albums
1965 albums
Concept albums
Capitol Records albums
Albums produced by Brian Wilson
Albums recorded at United Western Recorders
Albums recorded at Gold Star Studios